Bagrationovskaya is a Moscow Metro station, located on the surface portion of the Filyovskaya Line. Designed by Rimidalv Pogrebnoy and Cheremin and opened in 1961 as part of the western extension of the Filyovsky radius, the station unlike the other three coming from the centre, features a more functional design innovation.

Name
It is named after Prince and General Pyotr Bagration.

Building

The station is located at the Metro line's intersection with Barklaya Street, which crosses the platform on an overpass. Entrance vestibules are located on the upper level, above the platform. Canopies (supported by white marble pillars) and the road overpass provide some shelter to waiting passengers, but constant exposure to the elements has left the station in a state of disrepair. A project that involves renovating and enclosing the station is currently under way.

Traffic
Today the station is one of the busiest, due to the proximity of the Gorbushka shopping centre.

External links
metro.ru
mymetro.ru
KartaMetro.info — Station location and exits on Moscow map (English/Russian)

Moscow Metro stations
Railway stations in Russia opened in 1961
Filyovskaya Line